Downtown Redmond station is a future Link light rail station on the north side of Redmond Town Center shopping mall in downtown Redmond, Washington. It will be elevated located along Cleveland Street (SR 202) between 164th and 166th avenues.

The station was originally included in the Sound Transit 2 ballot measure in 2008, but was left out of the East Link Extension after a funding shortfall stemming from the City of Bellevue's desire for a tunneled alignment under Downtown Bellevue. Sound Transit instead completed environmental reviews and selected a preferred alignment to Downtown Redmond, indefinitely deferring the final segment of East Link until a later date. The Sound Transit 3 ballot measure, passed in 2016, includes $1.1 billion in funding for the two stations in Downtown Redmond, which was planned to open by 2024. Preliminary engineering on the Redmond extension was approved in February 2016, after being suspended in 2010.

References 

Future Link light rail stations
Link light rail stations in King County, Washington
Buildings and structures in Redmond, Washington
Railway stations scheduled to open in 2025